Linda Ruutu (born 17 February 1990) is a Finnish football forward currently playing for PK-35 Vantaa,

Honours 
PK-35 Vantaa
Winner
 Naisten Liiga: 2014
 Finnish Women's Cup: 2013

Runners-up
 Naisten Liiga: 2013

HJK
Winner
 Finnish Women's Cup: 2010
 Liiga Cup Naiset (3): 2010, 2011, 2012

External links 
 

1990 births
Living people
Women's association football forwards
Finnish women's footballers
Finland women's international footballers
Kansallinen Liiga players